Club de Deportes La Serena S.A.D.P., is a Chilean football club based in the city of La Serena, Coquimbo Region. The club was founded 9 December 1955 and plays in the first division of the Chilean football league. Their home games are played at the La Portada stadium, which has a capacity of 17,194 seats. Their biggest rival is Coquimbo Unido. They are nicknamed "Los Papayeros", because of the papayas that are grown near La Serena in the Elqui Valley.

History
The history of the club are in the amateur football team in the city of La Serena, which was crowned national amateur champion three times in the years 1949, 1951 and 1954. This was the basis for that in 1955 the Football Association of the city invited to participate in professional football. Thus 9 December 1955, was founded the Club de Deportes La Serena to participate in the 1956 Ascent. To give life regulatory to the club was Deportivo Sindempart the local team had to change its name.

Their first match in second division was against Unión La Calera in the Estadio La Portada, a match that ended in a draw 0–0. In their first season, Deportes La Serena finished at the top of the table (with the same points as Universidad Católica), so they had to play an extra match to determine the champion, which was won by Universidad Católica 3–2, with the latter getting promoted to the First Division.

In 1958 Deportes La Serena for the first time participated in first division and finished third, tying in Colo-Colo score and one point behind champion that year Santiago Wanderers. During this season, club striker Carlos Verdejo was the scorer of the championship with 23 points, next to the player, Green Cross, Gustavo Albella.

In 1959 began with La Serena reaching the final of the Copa Chile, where he lost 5–1 against Santiago Wanderers. In that same championship striker José Sulantay was crowned top scorer of the tournament. However, in the official tournament in La Serena, ranked last, relegated to the next season.

The 1960s began with the club again reached the final of the Copa Chile, where defeated by 4–1 to Santiago Wanderers and were crowned champions of the tournament. For the official tournament La Serena ranked second in the Tournament of Ascent to 5 points behind champions Green Cross. The following year, La Serena, ranked fourth, but rose to first in this year were four teams that rose.

In 1962 with the first team again, Deportes La Serena made a good campaign that finally placed him fourth, tying score with Colo-Colo, and the following year, under the coaching staff of the Argentine Miguel Mocciola returned to make a good season finishing in third place.

Thereafter Deportes La Serena began to settle in the mid-table, getting seventh in 1964, the ninth in 1965 and again the seventh in 1966 and 1967.

For the year 1968 the tournament was played in several stages and Serena failed to qualify for the final stages, so it had to fight for their stay in the division of honour, which eventually succeeded. In 1969 also failed to reach the final stages of the championship.

In 1993 was founded a bar called "Anarko revolucion", which is dedicated to encouraging this club football.

It promoted again to First Division of the year 2003, being runner-up after Everton of Primera B. For the play-offs (qualified in 2002), only ranked in the Torneo Clausura 2005 where he progressed to the semi-finals Colo-Colo, after a draw in matches Round-trip 1–1 and 3–3, by definition a criminal, which fell to Universidad Católica (3–3 and 1–0). In 2009, La Serena qualifying to the play-offs to this year and was eliminated by Colo-Colo in the global by 4–0.

In 2015 Canadian born Pancho Fernandez at the age of 18 was discovered by past Colo-Colo player (Carlos Rivas) who arranged to showcase him along with a number of Canadian soccer players to a number of Chilean teams. At that time Deportes La Serena expressed an interest in Pancho Fernandez and is now playing for their second team.  During the 2017 pre-season, Pancho Fernandez had the opportunity to play in two matches where he came off the bench on one and started in another.  Pancho Fernandez is the first Canadian born who is not of Chilean descent to ever play for Deportes La Serena.

Stadium

Deportes La Serena plays at home at Estadio La Portada, premises owned by the Municipality of La Serena. It is located close to downtown, at the intersection with Avenida Avenida Amunátegui Balmaceda and his name is because between 1770 and 1903, at the same intersection where it is currently the stadium, there was a monument that served as main entrance to the city, which was called La Portada de La Serena.

The stadium was opened on 26 August 1952 and at first it was a dirt field, filling in until November 1955, coinciding with the arrival of professionalism Deportes La Serena. It currently has a capacity of 17,194 spectators.

National honours
Copa Chile
1960

Primera B
1957, 1987, 1996

Players

Current squad

2021 Winter Transfers

In

Out

Notable players

Managers

 Alberto Buccicardi (1956–57)
 Pedro Areso (1961)
 Miguel Mocciola (1962–63)
 Francisco Molina (1965)
 Dante Pesce (1968)
 Caupolicán Peña (1973)
 Dante Pesce (1980)
 Juan Rodríguez (1983)
 José Sulantay (1987–88)
 Germán Cornejo (1988)
 Alberto Quintano (1988–89)
 Luis Santibañez (1989)
 José Santos (1990–91)
 Eddio Inostroza (1992)
 Pedro García Barros (1993)
 Roberto Hernández (1993)
 Guillermo Yávar (1994–95)
 José Sulantay (1995)
 Gustavo Huerta (1996–99)
 Dante Pesce (1999)
 Iván Castillo (1999)
 Claudio Mendoza (2000)
 Hugo Valdivia (2000)
 Hugo Solís (2000–01)
 Nicola Hadwa (2002)
 Miguel Ángel Gamboa (2003)
 Jorge Silva (2003–04)
 Danilo Chacón (2004)
 Miguel Ángel Fullana (2004)
 Dagoberto Olivares (2004–05)
 Víctor Hugo Castañeda (March 2005–Dec 10)
 Fernando Vergara (Jan 2011–May 11)
 Miguel Ponce (June 2011–Sept 12)
 Marcelo Caro (Oct 2012–Jan 13)
 Gonzalo Benavente (Jan 2013–May 13)
 Sergio Carmona (June 2013–Nov 13)
 Luis Pérez (Nov 2013–Oct 14)
 Horacio Rivas (Nov 2014–June 15)
 Luis Musrri (July 2015–Sept 16)
 Jaime García (Sept 2016–Dec 2017)
 Ariel Pereyra (Dec 2017–)

References

External links
  Official Club web site

 
La Serena
Association football clubs established in 1955
Sport in Coquimbo Region
1955 establishments in Chile